Figali Convention Center (or Amador Convention Center) is an indoor sports arena, in Fort Amador, Panama City, Panama. The capacity of the arena is 25,000.

Built in 2003, as the main venue for the Miss Universe 2003 Pageant, which took place in Panama that year. Since then, it has been used mainly for many concerts and sports events, such as boxing and ice skating.

Notable events
On March 8, 2010, Metallica performed a show as part of their Latin American Leg of the " World Magnetic Tour " .
On April 12, 2011, Shakira performed a sold-out show in the convention center as part of her 2011 "Sun Comes Out World Tour"
On May 24, 2011, American superstar Miley Cyrus performed in the convention center as part of her 2011, Gypsy Heart Tour.
On June 14, 2012, American popstar Jennifer Lopez kicked off her first world tour, Dance Again World Tour, at the convention center.
October 15, 2015, Katy Perry with her Prismatic World Tour, it was the second-last show of this tour.
April 21, 2017, Canadian pop singer Justin Bieber performed here as part of his Purpose World Tour.

References

External links

Indoor arenas in Panama
Convention centers in Panama
Sports venues in Panama City
Basketball venues in Panama